Boss Hog  is the second studio album by the hard rock band Boss Hog. It was released in 1995 on Geffen Records.

Critical reception
The Rough Guide to Rock called the album a "raucous smattering of straight-on punk thrashes coupled with some more off-the-wall moments (such as the neo-gothic 'Texas' and the Ike Turner cover, 'I Idolize You.'"

Track listing
All tracks by Boss Hog except where noted.

 "Winn Coma" – 2:17
 "Sick" – 3:43
 "Beehive" – 1:50
 "Ski Bunny" – 2:00
 "Green Shirt" – 1:51
 "I Dig You" – 3:15
 "Try One" – 1:49
 "What the Fuck" – 1:54
 "White Sand" – 2:40
 "I Idolize You" (Ike Turner) – 2:59
 "Punkture" – 2:30
 "Strawberry" – 2:51
 "Walk In" – 2:55
 "Texas" – 3:51
 "Sam" – 2:52

Personnel 
 Jon Spencer – guitar
 Cristina Martinez – vocals
 Jens Jurgensen – bass
 Hollis Queens – drums

References

External links
 

1995 albums
Boss Hog albums
Geffen Records albums
Albums produced by Steve Fisk